Cyrus Sullivan Clark (December 8, 1809–July 28, 1880), together with George Benson Hall Jr. and the British American Land Company, were the largest participants in the lumber industry in the Eastern Townships of Quebec in the 19th Century.

Biography

Personal life
Born in Minot, Maine, he attended Waterville College and graduated in 1828, becoming a grocer in Portland, Maine. He later went into the lumber industry, involved in both manufacturing and dealing, and lived in Bangor, Maine for several years. He moved to Portland in 1854, and lived there until his death.

Business career
When the St. Lawrence and Atlantic Railroad was opened between Montreal and Portland in 1853, entrepreneurs from Montreal, Quebec City, New York City and Maine began to compete for berths around Lake Aylmer in order to replace Maine's declining lumber supplies. He also owned 145,500 arpents (about) of land adjoining Lake Temiscouata and the Madawaska River, 19 licences on the Saint-Maurice River, and a town lot in Sherbrooke.

Because of cash flow problems in 1855, Clark, together with his partners W.H. McCrillis and Thomas Howe, transferred all their Canadian properties and licences to City Bank and the Bank of Montreal in trust. When the Panic of 1857 resulted in an oversupply in the US timber market, the banks auctioned off their debt, which John Henry Pope bought for $30,000. Clark would later buy back the properties and licences from Pope in 1869, and Pope remained as the chief spokesman for the company afterwards.

In 1872, the British American Land Company sold  to Clark, who purchased a further  from the company in the following year. These holdings were approximately half the size of the Crown timber limits that he already possessed. During the Long Depression of the 1870s, Clark would lose these lands as a consequence of a default on the mortgage on his properties, but would be able to repurchase  from the Eastern Townships Bank by 1879–80. He would formally enter into partnership with Pope to form the Brompton Mills Lumber Company.

Further reading

Notes and references

Notes

References

External links
 
 

1809 births
1880 deaths
People from Minot, Maine
Businesspeople from Portland, Maine
Businesspeople in timber
People from Bangor, Maine
19th-century American businesspeople